Darlington is a market town in County Durham, England. The unitary authority borough named after the town which forms its centre is a constituent member of the devolved Tees Valley area.

A tributary of the River Tees, to the south of the town, known as the River Skerne flows through the town. The town is near the Yorkshire Dales National Park, being  from the park boundary near the town of Richmond.  the town's estimated population was 93,417, an increase from 92,363 at the 2011 census.

In the 19th century, establishment of the Stockton and Darlington Railway (the world's first permanent steam locomotive powered passenger railway) led to the town having an industrial and manufacturing economy. The town has a finance sector which came from the businesses of Quaker families in the area.

History

Darnton

Darlington started as an Anglo-Saxon settlement. The name Darlington derives from the Anglo-Saxon Dearthington, which seemingly meant 'the settlement of Deornoth's people', but by Norman times the name had changed to Derlinton. During the 17th and 18th centuries, the town was usually known by the name of Darnton.

Darlington has a historic market area in the town centre. St Cuthbert's Church, built in 1183, is one of the most important early English churches in the north of England and is Grade I listed. The oldest church in Darlington is St Andrew's Church, built around 1100 in Haughton-le-Skerne.

When the author Daniel Defoe visited the town during the 18th century, he noted that it was eminent for "good bleaching of linen, so that I have known cloth brought from Scotland to be bleached here". However he also disparaged the town, writing that it had "nothing remarkable but dirt." (roads would have typically been unpaved in the 18th century.)

The so-called "Durham Ox" came from Darlington (born in the early 19th century, this steer became renowned for its excellent proportions, which came to inform the standard for Shorthorn cattle.)

Victorian era

Stivvies

During the early 19th century, Darlington remained a small market town.

The Stockton and Darlington Railway ran steam locomotives designed for passengers and goods, built to a standard gauge, on a permanent main line with branches. On 27 September 1825, George Stephenson's engine, "Locomotion No. 1", travelled between Shildon and Stockton-on-Tees via Darlington, an event that was seen as ushering in the modern railway age.

Later in the 19th century, the town became an important centre for railway manufacturing. An early railway works was the Hopetown Carriage Works (est. 1853), which supplied carriages and locomotives to the Stockton and Darlington Railway. The engineering firm of William and Alfred Kitching also manufactured locomotives there around this time. The town eventually developed three significant railway works. The largest of these was the main-line Darlington Works, whose main factory, the North Road Shops, opened in 1863 and remained in operation until 1966. A second works, Robert Stephenson & Co. (colloquially: "Stivvies"), moved to Darlington from Newcastle upon Tyne in 1902. It was renamed "Robert Stephensons & Hawthorns" in 1937, was absorbed by English Electric around 1960, and had closed by 1964. The third was Faverdale Wagon Works, which was established in 1923 and closed in 1962. In the 1950s, it was a UK pioneer in applying mass-production techniques to the manufacture of railway goods wagons.

Quakers and the Echo

During the 19th century, Darlington Quaker families such as those of Pease and Backhouse emerged as major employers and philanthropists. Industrialist Joseph Pease gave Darlington its landmark clock tower in 1864. The clock face was crafted by T. Cooke & Sons of York, and bells cast by John Warner & Sons of nearby Norton-on-Tees. The bells are sisters to Big Ben.

Darlington Mechanics Institute was opened in 1854 by Elizabeth Pease Nichol, who had donated towards its cost.

Architect Alfred Waterhouse, famous for work including London's Natural History Museum and Manchester Town Hall, designed  Darlington’s Grade II listed Old Town Hall and Market Hall, Darlington in 1860. Four years later he contributed Backhouse's Bank building that is, a branch of Barclays bank.

During the period, George Gordon Hoskins was responsible for much of the town's architecture, designing buildings such as The King's Head Hotel.

Darlington Free Library, a Grade II listed building in Crown Street, was built for £10,000 by Edward Pease. His daughter, Lady Lymington, opened the building on 23 October 1885 and presented it to the town council who agreed to operate it in perpetuity.  it contains a library and "centre for local studies".

In 1870, The Northern Echo newspaper launched. Its most famous editor, William Thomas Stead, died on the Titanic. Facing the present Northern Echo building on Priestgate is the William Stead public house named for him.

Wars

In 1939, Darlington had the most cinema seats per capita in the United Kingdom.

On the night of 13 January 1945, a Lancaster bomber piloted by Pilot Officer William Stuart McMullen of Canada was on a training exercise when one of its engines caught fire and it crashed on farmland near Lingfield Lane. McMullen heroically stayed at the controls while his crew parachuted to safety and directed the stricken aircraft away from the houses below. He was killed on impact. His heroism was honoured by renaming Lingfield Lane "McMullen Road" and erecting a memorial monument.

Tornado and the brick train

Starting in 1993, rail enthusiast group A1 Steam Locomotive Trust worked on building an all-new steam locomotive, the first to be constructed since the 1960s. It was intended to be the 50th member of the long withdrawn LNER Peppercorn Class A1 engine, called Tornado and numbered 60163, from scratch in the 1853 former Stockton and Darlington Railway Carriage Works at Hopetown. Many of the original fleet had been built at Darlington locomotive works in the late 1940s. Tornado was completed in January 2008.

To commemorate the town's contribution to the railways, David Mach's 1997 work Train is located alongside the A66, close to the original Stockton–Darlington railway. It is a life-size brick sculpture of a steaming locomotive emerging from a tunnel, made from 185,000 Accrington Nori bricks. The work had a budget of £760,000.

21st century

A 2005 Darlington Borough Council project to pedestrianise areas of the town centre, this included some Victorian features along High Row. In August 2008, a fire, which nobody was killed in the blaze, caused damage and weeks of closure until the damage fixed for several shops (including Woolworths). The King's Head Hotel was also affected with damage to the roof and 100 bedrooms, the hotal was able to reopen in 2012.

Governance

On 1 April 1997, the Borough of Darlington became a unitary authority area with the formation of Darlington Borough Council, which separated it from the non-metropolitan county of Durham for administrative purposes only, as the town is still within County Durham for ceremonial purposes. Although the former districts and boroughs of Durham now form the unitary authority of County Durham. This means that County Durham now has four unitary authorities. ,
the Member of Parliament (MP) for this seat is Conservative Peter Gibson. Former members of parliament for the town include Jenny Chapman, Alan Milburn, the former Secretary of State for Health under the Tony Blair Labour government and Michael Fallon, who was Secretary of State for Defence under the David Cameron coalition government and Theresa May's Conservative government.

Geography

Darlington is located in the south of County Durham close to the River Tees, which acts as the border between Durham and Yorkshire. Both the River Tees and River Skerne pass through the borough, the Skerne later joining the Tees which then flows east and into the North Sea.

Areas within the Borough
In the north are Harrowgate, Coatham Mundeville and Beaumont Hill and to the north-east are Whinfield and Haughton Le Skerne. To the east is the suburb of Eastbourne and Red Hall with Firthmoor and Skerne Park to the south. Situated in the west end are Hummersknott, Mowden and Blackwell. Finally, to the north-west are Branksome, Cockerton, Faverdale, The Denes, West Park, High Grange and Pierremont which is associated with the notable Henry Pease (MP).

Distance to other places

Economy
The trend of regional gross value added of Darlington at current basic prices published (pp. 240–253) by the Office for National Statistics, with figures in £ millions.

Darlington was un-industrial throughout the 20th century, with finance and manufacturing as the main elements of its economy.

Service Sector
A major employer in the area is the English division of the Student Loans Company, Student Finance England, which is based at Lingfield Point and employs over 1,000 people. Other large service sector companies with offices in the town include Darlington Building Society.
Darlington Borough Council announced that the site for the DL1 complex, previously a car park for Darlington Town Hall, was also to be redeveloped to house riverside office space for the Department for Education to replace its previous office on the edge of the town in Mowden, in an effort to safeguard Darlington jobs. This was officially opened on 19 March 2015. The Disclosure and Barring Service has a national office in the town. Amazon UK operates a warehouse facility, which opened in early 2020, employing 1,300 full-time staff, one of the town’s biggest employers.

Telecommunication
EE is the largest private sector employer in the town, with 2,500 staff. The company took over its operations from one of its predecessors, Orange Mobile. The international telecommunications company BT Group recently announced Darlington as one of the economically important locations in England to have BT fibre-optic cables installed underground as part of the company's BT Infinity superfast broadband rollout project. BT Group cites its decision to include Darlington in the national rollour of multi-provider fibre optic (cable) broadband as necessary due to the towns relatively large amount of IT demanding firms and future plans for developments including space for high-tech firms.

Morton Park
The Morton Park area of Darlington is currently undergoing a partial redevelopment, with areas of unused waste land being redeveloped into modern industrial and office space.  Companies based in Morton Park and the surrounding area are Infoserve Ltd and vehicle rental company Northgate Vehicle Hire. Morrisons supermarket at Morton Park opened in August 1995.

Other commercial spaces in Darlington include North Road Industrial Estate, which includes a Morrisons supermarket; Cleveland Trading Estate and Faverdale Industrial Estate. The council depot on Central Park is also to be redeveloped into commercial space.

Engineering
Darlington has a rich engineering heritage and several notable engineering firms established locally. Bridge building was particularly important in the town. Bridges built in Darlington span the River Nile and Amazon.

Local engineering firms include:
 Cummins has an engine building facility near Morton Park.
  AMEC‘s industrial arm is headquartered in the town
Darlington Forge Company originated in the town, circa 1967 
Whessoe originated in Darlington

Retail and leisure
 
As an historic market town, a weekly outdoor market was held on the market square, which is one of the biggest in the country. An indoor market is located underneath the town clock on Prebend Row.

They are a number of shops in the area:
Prebend Row also hosts the Cornmill Shopping centre
Grange Road and Skinnergate has a number of independent shops
Duke Street houses art galleries and restaurants
 Argos, a UK retail company, has its largest warehouse distribution centre in the North of England located in Darlington. This centre is within the Faverdale Industrial Estate, North West of the town. The Argos shop is located in the town centre Sainsbury’s.
Magnet Group has a shop and site in the town
Aldi has a shop and distribution centre
Bannatyne’s Fitness is headquartered in Darlington and runs a gym in the town.
House of Fraser, trading as Binns (department store), is a major retailer in the town.

In November 2012, a deal was signed between Darlington Borough Council and developer Terrace Hill for a £30 million re-development of the site of the former Feethams bus depot. The development includes a new multiplex cinema run by Vue Cinemas to serve Darlington and the wider South Durham area, as the area currently has no multiplex cinema. The development has an 80 bedroom Premier Inn hotel, and various food and drink venues including Prezzo, Bella Italia and Hungry Horse. The proposal had an expected completion date of late 2014, though this did overrun with completion early 2016.

Hospital

Darlington Memorial Hospital is on Hollyhurst Road, in the corridor between Woodland Road and The Denes.

Culture and landmarks

Theatre
The former Civic Theatre, now The Hippodrome, is a popular arts venue in the town, hosting a mix of musicals, dramas, plays and pantomimes. In 2016, Darlington Civic Theatre closed to mark the start of a £12.3 million renovation project that included a £4.5 million lottery grant from the Heritage Lottery Fund and revamped as 'The Hippodrome' and connects to the children's theatre 'Hullabaloo'.

Forum Music Centre

The Forum Music Centre, opened in 2004, hosts regular live music events, from Ska and Punk to Indie and Classic Rock. It also runs a comedy club. As well as live music, the facility houses a state of the art recording studio and several rehearsal rooms. The Carmel Rhythm Club, at Carmel College in the Hummersknott end of town, was another music venue. It opened the same year as the Forum.

Dog Show

Darlington Dog Show was a championship event from 1969. It was usually held in September on the showground in South Park; but it has now moved to Ripon.

Mosque

The Jamia Mosque and Islamic Society of Darlington is located in the North Lodge Terrace area of the town, an area with a relatively high proportion of ethnic minority residents (39.2% of the population in that area, compared to a town average of 6.3%). Constituted as a charity under UK law in 1982, the mosque offers worship facilities, as well as Islamic education, and has its own telecommunications mast for calls to prayer.

Transport

Air
The airport was known as Durham Tees Valley Airport from 2004 until mid-2019. It has flights to a few domestic locations across the UK and international flights to some locations in Europe. Many private or general aviation Flights use the airport. The airport has a Fire Training Centre which trains many airport firefighters.

The nearest large airports are Newcastle and Leeds Bradford.

Rail

Local services run from North Road railway station, the town's original station. Darlington railway station lies on the East Coast Main Line and has regular services to London Kings Cross, Leeds City, Edinburgh Waverley, Manchester Piccadilly, Manchester Airport and Newcastle.

Darlington railway station also serves as the mainline interchange for Middlesbrough station, which itself has few intercity services. Darlington also has access to the Tees Valley Line connecting all the main settlements along the River Tees, running from Bishop Auckland to Saltburn via Darlington, Stockton-on-Tees and Middlesbrough.

Darlington railway station has a large Victorian clock tower which can be seen throughout large areas of the town.

Roads
Darlington is well connected to the North East's major trunk route, the A1(M), which bypasses the town to the west. It was completed in 1965, replacing the Great North Road route which is now known as the A167. The town is served by three closely-spaced junctions of the A1(M): Junctions 57 A66(M), 58 A68, and 59 A167. Junction 59 is the access exit for Darlington motorway services (Newton Park), with an onsite filling station, hotel and restaurant. Darlington is also close to other major trunk routes, including the A66 trans-Pennine route connecting Darlington to Stockton-on-Tees and the A19.

The £5.9 million  A66 Darlington eastern bypass opened on 25 November 1985. The Darlington Eastern Transport Corridor, linking the Central Park regeneration zone (Haughton Road) and Darlington town centre to a new roundabout on the A66, was opened in the summer of 2008.

Bus

Bus transport in the town is provided by Arriva North East. 

Stagecoach used to operate in the town until 2007, when it sold its operations to Arriva. Arriva services connect Darlington to neighbouring towns and cities such as Durham, Bishop Auckland, Richmond, Stockton, and Middlesbrough.

There are also two smaller independent operators running services in the town, called Dales & District and Hodgsons Buses.

Pavement
Darlington was chosen by the Department for Transport as one of three national Sustainable Travel Demonstration Towns (together with Peterborough and Worcester) in 2004 and delivering a three-year research and marketing programme to promote sustainable travel choices under the brand name 'Local Motion'. It was also chosen as one of six cycling demonstration towns in October 2005, receiving £3 million worth of funding from the government and local council money.

2007 Town Centre Pedestrian Heart Project worth 10 million pounds, saw some of Darlington Town Centre modernised, with an emphasis on vehicles becoming less common in the centre and some roads pedestrianised completely. Other improvements were to cycling facilities and routes, and linking the town to the national cycle route network. Darlington is the only place to win both sustainable travel and cycling demonstration town status.

Education

Museums and heritage

The town's main museum is Head of Steam, sited near North Road railway station – it and Piercebridge Roman Fort near the town are run by the Darlington Museum Service.

Institutions

Teesside University opened a Darlington campus in 2011. It offers higher education in the town to students and businesses.

The town has one further education college, Darlington. It has two sixth forms, the Queen Elizabeth Sixth Form College and Carmel College, Darlington sixth form.

There are multiple secondary schools including: Carmel College, Wyvern, Haughton, Hummersknott, Hurworth School, Longfield and St Aidan's. Polam Hall is a former independent school and is now a free school.

There are also multiple primary schools including: Federation of Abbey Schools, Mowden School, West Park School, Skerne Park primary school

Media
Darlington is home to the regional daily newspaper The Northern Echo and its sister weekly newspaper Darlington & Stockton Times.

The regional radio station 'Darlo Radio' broadcasts from the town.

In November 2009 the town appointed an official 'Twitterer in residence', the first of its kind in the UK. Mike McTimoney (known on Twitter as TheDarloBard) is a local regular Twitter user who has been officially charged with tweeting for and about Darlington, and to help promote The Darlington Experiment 2.0, the town's social media campaign.

In August 2022, Darlington Borough Council confirmed that it would be placing a bid for Darlington to host the 2023 Eurovision Song Contest. However, the town was not part of the shortlist of potential host cities released on 12 August.

Sport

Football codes
The town is home to Darlington Football Club which play at Blackwell Meadows and play in National League North. Darlington Railway Athletic F.C., plays in the Wearside League Division One and play at Brinkburn Road.

Darlington FC is known as The Quakers because of the contributions made to the town by men such as Edward and Joseph Pease, members of the Religious Society of Friends. Before the 2012 administration, played at the 25,000 capacity Darlington Arena (after 120 years at the Feethams ground) when it opened on Neasham Road in 2003. In the 2010–11 season Darlington won the FA Trophy however they were relegated from the Football League, into the then Football Conference. Administration caused Darlington to play home games at Heritage Park in Bishop Auckland and relegation by four divisions to Division One of the Northern Football League, of which the club was one of the founders of in 1889, for the 2012–13 season. It moved back to Darlington from the 2016/17 season with a long term groundshare arrangement with Darlington RFC at Blackwell Meadows. Darlington's first home game at Blackwell Meadows (a 3–2 home win against Halifax Town) took place on 26 December 2016. In the subsequent season, the club was allowed to change back to its current name.

Darlington has two Rugby Union clubs Darlington Mowden RFC and Darlington RFC. Darlington Mowden Park play in National League 1, the third tier of English rugby union. The club own and play at the Darlington Arena, which played a role in the 2015 Rugby World Cup as hosts to the New Zealand national team. Darlington RFC play at Blackwell Meadows in Durham/Northumberland 2.

Other
Cricket clubs are Darlington Cricket Club and Darlington Railway Athletic Cricket Club. Both play in the North Yorkshire and South Durham Cricket League, Darlington CC won the league twenty times during the 20th century.

Darlington's leading athletics club, the Darlington Harriers, was formed in 1891 and has had a number of successful athletes wearing the club colours as well as GB vests. The club celebrated its 125th year in 2016, with anniversary games held at Eastbourne Sports Complex. The Darlington 10K road run is held every August, and attracts several thousand competitors.

The Dolphin Centre, which provides a wide range of sporting facilities, was opened by Roger Bannister in 1982. It received a £5 million refurbishment in 2006 and was later officially opened by Redcar athlete Tanni Grey-Thompson.

Notable people

 George Allison – football manager in 1930s
 James Atkinson (1780–1852) – surgeon, artist and Persian scholar
 Duncan Bannatyne – entrepreneur, residence in Darlington and company offices of Bannatyne Fitness Ltd
 Nick Bilton – columnist for The New York Times and bestselling author
 Julie Bindel – journalist, columnist, political activist, lesbian and gay rights campaigner, born in Darlington 
 Zoe Birkett – singer, runner up on television show Pop Idol
 Sandra Bowman – Olympic and Commonwealth Games swimmer in 1980s
 Aidan Chambers – children's author
 Peter Chapman – convicted murderer, born in Darlington in 1977, brought up in nearby Stockton on Tees.
 Tom Craddock – footballer
 James Cudworth – Locomotive Superintendent for the South Eastern Railway (1845–76)
 Alex Cunningham – MP for Stockton North
 Giles Deacon – fashion designer
 J. M. Dent – publisher, produced Everyman's Library series
 Frederick Dickens – Charles Dickens' beloved scapegrace brother, buried in the West Cemetery.
 Harry Dobinson – footballer
 Elizabeth Esteve-Coll (née Kingdon) – Director of the Victoria and Albert Museum in London, the first woman to head a national arts institution.
 John W. Ewbank – landscape and marine painter 
 Simon Farnaby – actor, writer and comedian
 Don Featherstone – filmmaker
 Ruth Gemmell – actress
 Ian Hamilton – poet and editor
 Ann Heron – victim of notorious unsolved murder in the town in 1990
 Ralph Hodgson – poet
 George Gordon Hoskins – architect responsible for many of Darlington's Victorian buildings
 Glenn Hugill – actor and television producer
 Richard Hurndall – actor
 Robert Anderson Jardine – vicar
 John Kenworthy – aeronautical engineer and aircraft designer in World War I
 Alan Kitching – typographic artist and teacher
 Philippa Langley – discovered the remains of Richard III in a car park in Leicester in 2012
 Mary Lawson (1910–1940) – stage and film actress of 1920s and 1930s, born in Darlington, killed in air raid on Liverpool
 Michael Lee – hard rock drummer (Little Angels, The Cult, Page and Plant, Thin Lizzy)
 Neil Maddison – footballer
 Jann Mardenborough – racing driver, Le Mans podium finisher
 James Morrison – footballer
Christopher M Pattinson GB International Swimmer (1976–1980)
 Al Pease – racing driver, only F1 driver disqualified for going too slow (1969 Canadian Grand Prix)
 Edward Pease (1767–1858) – Quaker industrialist and railway pioneer
 Joseph Pease (1799–1872) – Quaker industrialist and railway pioneer, first Quaker M.P.
 Julie Rayne – singer and actress 
 Vic Reeves – comedian and author, lived in Darlington as teenager Jim Moir in 1970s
 Katherine Routledge (née Pease) – archaeologist and anthropologist, made first scientific survey of Easter Island
 Paul Smith OBE – former radio executive and technology entrepreneur
 Willie Smith – "possibly the best non-specialised, all round billiard player of all time", twice winner of World Billiards Championship out of two entries
 Sir John Summerson – architectural historian
 Paul Swift – professional stunt and precision driver
 Russ Swift – professional stunt and precision driver
Geoffrey Thwaites GB International Swimmer, 200m Backstroke at the 1964 Olympics
 William Thomas Stead – campaigning journalist, editor of The Northern Echo, died in sinking of the RMS Titanic
 Cherry Valentine (1993–2022) – drag queen
 David Varey (born 1961) – cricketer 
 Paul Walton – motoring journalist
 Giuseppe Wilson – footballer (Lazio and Italy)

Gallery

Twin towns
Darlington is twinned with:
 Mülheim an der Ruhr in Germany.
 Amiens in France.

See also

 Darlington Corporation Light Railways
 Trolleybuses in Darlington
 Murder of Ann Heron – infamous unsolved murder that occurred in the town in 1990

References and notes

External links

 www.pioneercourt.co.uk 

 Darlington Borough Council
 Statistics  about Darlington from the Office for National Statistics Census 2001
 Historic Postcards of Darlington
 Darlington Head of Steam Museum

 
Towns in County Durham
Railway towns in England
Places in the Tees Valley
Unparished areas in County Durham
Places in the Borough of Darlington